Indore–Ratlam DEMU is a passenger train of the Indian Railways, which runs between Indore Junction railway station of Madhya Pradesh and Ratlam Junction railway station of Madhya Pradesh.

In April 2016, it was announced that the train will be extended to Mhow once the Commissioner Railway Safety clears the Indore–Mhow line as the station can hold only 16 coaches.

Arrival and departure
 Train no.79312 departs from Indore, daily at 08:50, reaching Ratlam the same day at 11:30.
 Train no.79311 departs from Ratlam daily at 18:00. from platform no.1 reaching Laxmibai Nagar the same day at 20:40.

Route and halts
The train goes via . The important halts of the train are:

 
 
 Palia railway station
 Balauda Takun railway station
 Ajnod railway station
 
 Osra railway station
 Gautampura Road railway station
 Pirjhalar railway station
 Barnagar railway station
 Sunderabad railway station
 Runija railway station
 Pritam Nagar railway station
 Nauganwan railway station

Average speed and frequency
The train runs with an average speed of 44 km/h and completes 119 km in 2 hours 40 minutes. The train runs on a daily basis.

References

Transport in Indore
Railway services introduced in 2015
Rail transport in Madhya Pradesh
Diesel–electric multiple units of India
Transport in Ratlam